Major Rana Muhammad Shabbir Sharif  (c. 28 April 1943 – 6 December 1971) was a military officer in the Pakistan Army who was posthumously awarded the Nishan-e-Haider during the Indo-Pakistani War of 1971. He is the only person ever who received both the Nishan-e-Haider and Sitara-e-Jurat for his bravery. He is regarded as the most decorated officer of the Pakistan Army.

Early life and education
Sharif was born on 28 April 1943 in a Punjabi Rajput Bhatti Family at Kunjah, Gujrat District to Major Muhammad Muhammad Sharif. His father Major Muhammad Sharif & his mother Mohtarma Fazl Begum Sahiba was from a Punjabi Bhatti family.He attended St. Anthony's High School, Lahore. While at Government College Lahore, he received a call to join Pakistan Military Academy (PMA) Kakul.

He used to play squash and won an Army level swimming medal while he was in 4th Frontier Force Regiment.

Military career starting 
He was commissioned in Pakistan Army on 19 April 1961 and after successfully completing his training, after which he was awarded the Sword of Honor, he was posted to the 6th Battalion of the Frontier Force Regiment.

Nishan-e-Haider action
In the Indo-Pakistani War of 1971, the Pakistan Army launched an offensive on the Western front against the enemy. Sharif, as commander of a company of 6 Frontier Force Regiment, was ordered to capture high ground overlooking Grumukhi Khera and Beri, a village in the Sulemanki Sector.

On 3 December 1971, in a well-organized action, he fought alongside his men and held Indian attacks at bay. He cleared the Jhangar post by passing through the minefield laid by enemy and swimming across a water obstacle, the 'Sabuna distributary', whilst under intense enemy fire and led his company to capture the objective.

On the afternoon of 6 December, the enemy launched an offensive  preceded by air strikes and heavy artillery shelling. After casualties among the crew, he took over as a gunner on an anti-tank gun and started firing on the enemy tanks. While this fight was on, one of the enemy tanks fired at him thus killing him. His last words were quoted as: “Don’t lose the bridge.” It was the same bridge he died defending from the Indian Army's attack.

Family
His younger brother, General Raheel Sharif was the Chief of Army Staff (November 2013 - November 2016), the highest rank in the Pakistan Army. He is also the relative of another Nishan-e-Haider holder, Raja Aziz Bhatti.

In popular culture 
An Indian Malayalam film, 1971: Beyond Borders, was inspired by the story of Major Shabbir Sharif.

Awards and decorations

Other awards he won  are:

Sword of Honor

References

External links

Major Shabbir Sharif

1943 births
1971 deaths
People from Gujrat District
Punjabi people
St. Anthony's High School, Lahore alumni
Government College University, Lahore alumni
Pakistan Military Academy alumni
Pakistani male swimmers
Pakistan Army officers
Recipients of Sitara-e-Jurat
Pakistani military personnel killed in action
Recipients of Nishan-e-Haider